Democratic Bloc may refer to:

Democratic Bloc (Bahrain)
Democratic Bloc (Czech Republic)
Democratic Bloc (East Germany)
Democratic Bloc (Eritrea)
Democratic Bloc (Estonia)
Democratic Bloc (Poland)
Democratic Bloc (Ukraine)